Three Bridges is a bounded rural locality in Victoria, Australia, on the Yarra Junction Noojee Road, located within the Shire of Yarra Ranges local government area.

History
Three Bridges Post Office opened on 17 July 1914 and closed in 1956.

References

Towns in Victoria (Australia)
Yarra Ranges